Kozah could refer to:

Kozah Prefecture in Togo
Talos, a fictional deity in Dungeons & Dragons